Thabang Mosiako (born 23 February 1995) is a South African long-distance runner.

In 2017, he competed in the senior men's race at the 2017 IAAF World Cross Country Championships held in Kampala, Uganda. He finished in 47th place.

In 2019, he competed in the senior men's race at the 2019 IAAF World Cross Country Championships held in Aarhus, Denmark. He finished in 67th place.

References

External links 
 

Living people
1995 births
Place of birth missing (living people)
South African male long-distance runners
South African male cross country runners